Kumari is a town located in Kütahya, Turkey.

About
Latitude 39.4064 Longitude 29.9189 Altitude (feet) 4002  
Lat (DMS) 39° 24' 23N Long (DMS) 29° 55' 8E Altitude (meters) 1219 
Time zone (est) UTC+2(+3DT)

Nearby Cities and Towns  
West North East South  
Belence (3.3 nm)
Asagi Capak (2.9 nm) Aydogdu (0.6 nm) Yaylababa (5.0 nm)
Kuyusinir (3.0 nm)
Goynukoren (4.5 nm)

Towns in Turkey